The whitebelly tree frog (Osteocephalus alboguttatus) is a species of frog in the family Hylidae found in Ecuador and possibly Colombia and Peru. Its natural habitats are tropical and subtropical moist lowland forests, swamps, intermittent freshwater marshes, plantations, rural gardens, and heavily degraded former forests. It is threatened by habitat loss.

References

 Almandáriz, A., Cisneros-Heredia, D., Jungfer, K.-H., Coloma, L.A. & Ron, S. 2004.  

Osteocephalus
Amphibians of Ecuador
Amphibians described in 1882
Taxonomy articles created by Polbot